Hypersonic Missiles may refer to:

 Hypersonic Missiles (album), an album by Sam Fender
 "Hypersonic Missiles" (song), a song by Sam Fender

See also
 Hypersonic missile